This is a list of media related to the .hack multimedia franchise. The series encompasses anime, manga, novels, and video games. There are also two collectible card games based on the series.

Games

Video games

Collectible card game

Anime and film

Manga

Novels

Other

References

Media
.hack
.hack
.hack